Salem Academy may refer to any of several schools:

 Salem Academy in Winston-Salem, North Carolina
 Salem Academy Christian Schools in Salem, Oregon
 South Salem Academy in South Salem, Ohio
 Winston-Salem Preparatory Academy in Winston-Salem, North Carolina

See also
 Salem High School (disambiguation)
 Salem School (disambiguation)